Gangnam Zombie is a 2023 South Korean horror film starring Ji Il-joo and Park Ji-yeon. This is Ji Il-joo's first feature film and Park's first in 7 years. The film premiered on January 5, 2023.

Synopsis 
On the night just before Christmas, in the midst of the COVID-19 pandemic, two men in Seoul break into a container from China containing gold jewelry. But also in the container is a cat, which suddenly attacks and scratches one of the men. Later, as they retreat, the scratched man becomes sick, and as his concerned accomplice looks after him, his friend suddenly attacks him and bites his throat out before rolling into the nearby river. The scratched man floats in the current to the Gangnam District, where he emerges from the water and later catches public attention by consuming a hunk of raw, bloody meat in the streets.

Hyeon-seok, a former taekwondo champion, has recently moved to Seoul for work at a small online streaming firm in a Gangnam office building. He has a crush on his co-worker Min-jeong, but Min-jeong disapproves of him, while his carefree boss harresses her and has yet to make any profit and pay his workers a salary. The next day, the scratched man appears in the building and attacks people, who swiftly turn into flesh-craving zombies like him and bite any human being they enounter, rapidly spreading the infection. The owner of the building orders the exits to be locked, sealing everyone inside, before she and a wounded security guard are forced to flee to Hyeon-seok and Min-jeong's workplace and inform them of the situation.

Smelling a chance for profit, their boss insists on filming the carnage, but the group is discovered and attacked, and all but Hyeon-seok and Min-jeong are killed and infected. Unable to call for help because the phone lines are blocked, they try to fight their way out but are eventually cornered. Hyeon-seok shelters Min-jeong inside a minivan before reentering the fight. Just as he is being overwhelmed, Min-jeong rescues him with a fire extinguisher from the car, and they escape to the building's parkade. There, they are attacked by the scrachted man and the building's owner; they bring down both zombies, but Hyeon-seok is bitten by the building's owner. Knowing what will happen to him, he and Min-jeong share a tearful farewell until they discover that the woman was wearing dentures, thus saving him from infection. They make their way up to the garage's roof, but the scratched man unexpectedly recovers from his battering and follows them, leaving their fates uncertain.

Cast

Main 
 Ji Il-joo as Hyeon-seok
 Park Ji-yeon as Min-jeong

Supporting 
 Cho Kyung-hun as Wang-i
 Choi Seong-min
 Lee Joo-jeong
 Tak Teu-in as Dae Hyun, Hyeon-seok and Min-jeong's co-worker

Production 
In December 2021, Ji Il-Joo and Park Ji-yeon confirmed their participation in the film as Hyeon-seok and Min-jeong respectively. The movie was originally titled Gangnam ( 강남 ). Filming began in December 2021. The film will be distributed by Contents Panda.

Release 
Production companies Lee Film and Joy N Cinema promoted the film at the 2022 Cannes Film Festival and screened its first trailer. The film was pre-sold to multiple South East Asian countries including Thailand, Mongolia, and Vietnam. In Vietnam, the movie will be screened in over 40 theatres in Ho Chi Minh City alone.

The film premiered on January 5, 2023, in Vietnam, on January 5, 2023, in South Korea, and Thailand on January 12, the Philippines on January 18, and Mongolia on January 19, 2023,

In the United States, international distributor "Well Go USA" has acquired North American rights to the film. "Well Go USA" has been working on South Korean films for over a decade, including fan-favorite titles like The Wailing and The Villainess, the acclaimed Train to Busan franchise, and two of Korea's recent Oscar submissions for Best International Film: Escape from Mogadishu, and Burning—the first-ever Korean film to be shortlisted for the honor, The Witch 2: The Other One and the Cannes-debuting thriller Emergency Declaration.

Commercial performance 
The film was a commercial success according to production company Joy N Cinema which reported Gangnam Zombie was a great success and was their best-selling film at the 2022 Cannes Film Festival. The film was pre-sold in 134 countries before its release including North America, Germany, Thailand, Japan, the Philippines, Mongolia, South America, and Indonesia.

According to Box Office Vietnam, Gangnam Zombie ranked among the top highest-grossing films in Vietnam in its first days of release, being the only South Korean film on the list. The film ended up ranking at 3 on the weekend revenue in the country grossing 4,4B Dong (~$187,000 US) with only $9,000 US from 3rd place; Vietnamese thriller "Blue Wolf: Wild Chrysanthemum in the Night", over 48,000 moviegoers, ranking 3rd. It has accumulated about 6,7B Dong (~$285,000 US) during its first week .

Gangnam Zombie was also among the 16 notable films selected by Screen Daily at Cannes.

References

External links 
 
 
 
 
 

2023 films
2023 horror films
2020s South Korean films
2020s Korean-language films
South Korean horror films